Mark Day (born October 4, 1978) is a Canadian actor and broadcaster from Port Hawkesbury, Nova Scotia.

Career

1999–2004: Halifax and Toronto

In the fall of 1999, Day moved to Halifax and made his feature film debut as a young fisherman in the 2000 film Deeply starring Kirsten Dunst. His other early film roles include Songs in Ordinary Time starring Sissy Spacek and Beau Bridges, A Glimpse of Hell starring James Caan, Julie Walking Home starring Miranda Otto and A Hole in One starring Meat Loaf and Michelle Williams (actress).

While on the set of the TV movie, 'The Pilot's Wife', Day met actor Dax Ravina. The two formed a close friendship and collaborated with director Jay Dahl on two award-winning short films.

The first, Backumping was shot in Halifax in the fall of 2003. It's described as fast-paced, clips over documentary interviews with Mike and Cameron, two sport fanatics who have tried and mastered it all. Feeling bored and unchallenged, they are looking for the next big thing in extreme sports.

The film debuted at the BFI London Film Festival and went on to win several best film awards around the world.

Following the success of Backjumping, Day, Ravina and Dahl reunited to film Boyclops, a comedy chronicling the trials of a one-eyed teenager engaged in an epic athletic contest with a two-eyed rival.

The film opened at the Toronto International Film Festival and Atlantic Film Festival in 2004.

Shortly after the film's release, Mark moved to Toronto.

2004–2008: Toronto 

Shortly after moving to Toronto, he landed a recurring role on the critically praised Showcase Television sitcom It's Me...Gerald.

In 2005, Day co-starred in the CBC Television pilot Cheap Draft, reuniting him with Dax Ravina and award-winning filmmaker Jay Dahl.

While shooting Cheap Draft, he auditioned for the 8-part, one hour mini series October 1970. Day was offered a supporting lead role, playing Mark Lepage, Pierre Laporte's cabinet aide. The show aired on CBC and was based on the October Crisis in Quebec involving the terrorist activities of the FLQ.

In 2006, Day co-hosted the inaugural season of CBC's Hockeyville. Mark traveled across Canada, meeting with communities vying for a chance to win $100,000 in arena upgrades and a National Hockey League hockey game. The initial four episodes were shot at the Memorial Centre in Kingston, Ontario, with the final three episodes shot in Dave Andreychuk Mountain Arena & Skating Centre in Hamilton, Ontario.

In 2008, Mark portrayed Leon Weeks in the CTV/CBS co-production police drama series Flashpoint (Ep.317 "The Good Citizen"). Shortly after shooting Flashpoint, Day landed a role in the pilot episode of the A&E drama series Breakout Kings, playing the role of Jimbo Cantrell.

2009–Present: Toronto, Ottawa and Montreal

In 2009, Day appeared in the first of five season's on CBC Television The Ron James Show. He played various roles in 54 episodes of the comedy series, including the voices of Pa James and Cousin Davey in the L'il Ronnie cartoons.

After taking some time off from acting in 2014, Day returned to the screen in The Art of More, working alongside Dennis Quaid; Jacob's Wrath, which premiered at the Cannes Film Festival in 2017; and Mommy's Little Angel in 2018. His feature film credits include; Fatman, Mafia Inc and the upcoming thriller Misanthrope starring Shailene Woodley. 

He has several films in development as writer and producer, the first of which is based on the death of his best friend when he was 13 years old.

Mark Day is also an award winning News Anchor and Talk Show Host on CityNews in Ottawa.

Filmography

External links
Mark Day Official Web Site

References

1978 births
Living people
Acadia University alumni
Canadian male film actors
Canadian people of Scottish descent
Canadian male television actors
People from Antigonish, Nova Scotia
People from Inverness County, Nova Scotia